Hoheluftbrücke is a rapid transit station on the Hamburg U-Bahn line U3. The station was opened in May 1912 and is located in the Hamburg district of Harvestehude, Germany. Harvestehude is part of the borough of Eimsbüttel.

Service

Trains 
Hoheluftbrücke is served by Hamburg U-Bahn line U3; departures are every 5 minutes.

See also 

 List of Hamburg U-Bahn stations

References

External links 

 Line and route network plans at hvv.de 

Hamburg U-Bahn stations in Hamburg
U3 (Hamburg U-Bahn) stations
Buildings and structures in Eimsbüttel
1912 establishments in Germany
Railway stations in Germany opened in 2015